The Georgia News Network  or GNN is a news agency that provides newscasts, sportscasts, and talk programming for approximately 150 radio stations across the state of Georgia. GNN is owned by iHeartMedia.

News output

The Georgia News Network provides newscasts, sportscasts and weather forecasts 7 days a week to affiliate stations across the state of Georgia. This includes 2-minute and 1-minute hourly newscasts each day. The network also broadcasts major breaking news events and provides special reports during elections. Affiliate stations receive content either via satellite feed, FTP download or the GNN OnDemand website. This site provides links to audio downloads, such as newscasts, commercials and PSA announcements and historic radio broadcasts.

Georgia Focus is a 28-minute, self-contained public affairs broadcast. John Clark hosts the show, which features a new topic every week. Issues covered range from health care to public safety, from non-profits to authors and state government. GNN also broadcasts high school football playoffs annually on the same channel.

Weather
GNN measures weather conditions in all of Georgia state every half-hour over a period of 24 hours. Warnings are provided to the public in the event that there is severe weather in the region, such as a tornado

Former channels
News Room-Flagship WGST
Georgia Focus
Dave Merlino Show
Southern Race Week
Sports Conversations with Loran Smith
High School Football

On-Air Personalities
Matt McClure, Executive Producer/Morning Anchor

Liz Kennedy, PM Anchor

John Clark, Director/Host of 'Georgia Focus'

Mitch Evans, News & Sports Anchor/Reporter

Rebecca Hubbard, Anchor/Reporter

Scott Kimbler, Anchor/Reporter

Charley O'Brian, Anchor/Reporter

Rocio Rivera, Anchor/Reporter

Kathy White, Anchor/Reporter

Mark Woolsey, Anchor/Reporter

Tyrik Wynn, Anchor/Reporter

John Wetherbee, Meteorologist

Laura Huckabee, Meteorologist

Seth Everett, Sports Anchor

Frank Garrity, Sports Anchor

Former On-Air Personalities

Matt Cook, News Director/Morning Anchor (retired)

Doug Nodine, PM Anchor (retired)

Rob Stadler, PM Anchor (Now with the Impact Partnership)

References

News agencies based in the United States
Companies based in Atlanta
IHeartMedia